Margaret Scully Zimmele ( – ) was an American artist.  

She was the daughter of John Sullivan Scully, a wealthy Pittsburgh financier, and Mary Elizabeth Negley. Her brother was Pittsburgh mayor Cornelius D. Scully.

She attended the Pennsylvania College for Women and graduated from the Pittsburgh School of Design for Women in 1891.  She married attorney George R. Waters in 1897, but he drowned the next year.  She continued her art studies with a number of distinguished artists, including William Merritt Chase, Walter Shirlaw, Henry Keller, Sargent Kendall, Charles Hawthorn, William Whittemore, William Lathrop, Henry Snell, Daniel Garber, John F. Carlson, Henry Kirke Bush-Brown, and George Julian Zolnay.  Chase painted her portrait, perhaps as a wedding present.

She and her parents moved to Washington, D.C., in 1902.  In 1905, she married chemist Harry Bernard Zimmele.  He died the next year from injuries he sustained when an automobile struck their carriage in Schenley Park.  Margaret Zimmele was pregnant at the time and she named her daughter Harryette in his honor.  Harryette died very young, in 1929.

Zimmele was an active artist and clubwoman in Washington, D.C., thorough her life.  She was a founding member of the Arts Club of Washington and active in the Daughters of the American Revolution.  One cause she was particularly devoted to was anti-communism and created a series of propaganda postcards.  She continued to paint until 1961, when she was the victim of a vicious attack with a hammer.

Margaret Scully Zimmele died on 23 January 1964 in Chevy Chase, Maryland.

References 

Created via preloaddraft
1872 births
1964 deaths
Artists from Pittsburgh